I Think of You is a 1971 album by Perry Como.

"I Think of You" can also refer to:

 "I Think of You" (1963 song), a popular song written by Peter Lee Stirling
 "I Think of You" (1970 song), a popular song written by Francis Lai and Rod McKuen
 "I Think of You", a 1971 song by Rodriguez from his album Coming from Reality
 "I Think of You", a 1973 single by The Detroit Emeralds from their album I'm in Love with You
 "I Think of You", a 2017 song by Jeremih featuring Chris Brown and Big Sean

See also
 Think of You (disambiguation)